RegioExpress (RE) is a fast regional train service in Switzerland, run by Swiss Federal Railways (SBB CFF FFS) or other railway companies (such as TILO, BLS, tpf, transN, THURBO or RhB). It is comparable to the Regional-Express in Germany, Austria and Luxembourg.

Its speed is considerably faster than regional trains at the same level, as it does not stop at all stations served by the regional trains. Nonetheless, it is slightly slower than InterRegio trains. Swiss Federal Railways describes the trains as ones that serve "rapidly into the regions".

Until the 2003 timetable overhaul (December 2002 to December 2003), the RegioExpress was limited in circulation. One of the main lines which ran as a RegioExpress line (abbreviation: RX) was the Rheintal Express, from St. Gallen through Sargans to Chur (the other was the CityVogel from Zurich to Konstanz). As of the 2004 timetable overhaul, the RegioExpress was introduced as faster Regio (formerly regional) trains; the term was thrown into expanded usage. The abbreviation was changed to RE instead of the previous RX in the 2005 timetable. Recently, several companies have begun to number their RE lines, such as the MGB (e.g. RE42) and the TPF.

See also
 Train categories in Europe

References

Passenger rail transport in Switzerland